Rider from Tucson is a 1950 American Western film directed by Lesley Selander for RKO Pictures and starring Tim Holt and Richard Martin. It was the only time  Martin worked on screen with his wife Elaine Riley.

The film was known earlier as Gun Thunder.

Plot
Dave Saunders and sidekick, Chito Rafferty, visit their friend Tug Bailey who is engaged to Jane Whipple. Tug has a gold claim, and is reluctant to marry Jane because his life is now in danger from potential claim jumpers. John Avery, and wife, Gypsy, plan to jump Tug's claim. Gypsy hires Bob Rankin to kidnap Jane as her stagecoach enters town, telling Rankin that Jane is one of Gypsy's new showgirls and she wants to "kidnap" her as a joke. The plan goes awry after Rankin discovers Jane's kidnapping is actually leverage against Tug's claim. Rankin tells Gypsy he wants half the claim, or he will deal with Tug directly. Tug learns from the stage driver that Jane has been kidnapped. Dave and Chito persuade Tug to allow them to find Jane rather than surrender his claim.  Dave and Chito find Jane and free her when Rankin's gang abandon their hideout after a short skirmish. They take Jane to Mrs. O'Reilly's boarding house for safety. Jane understands Tug is reluctant to marry, but she is not told why.

Rankin arrives at Tug's ranch offering to split his claim in return for Jane. As they are negotiating the deal, Gypsy arrives, kills Rankin and knocks Tug unconscious taking him with her. Jackson, one of the henchmen, is left behind to dispose of Rankin's body. Jackson is interrupted by Dave and Chito. They see Jackson riding away and give chase. Unable to catch him, they return to Tug's and find Rankin's body. The sheriff and his deputies arrive, and arrest Dave and Chito for Rankin's murder. En route to jail, Dave and Chito overpower the sheriff's deputies and escape. In town, Dave and Chito find Jackson, who confesses that one of the Averys killed Rankin. Dave and Chito visit the boarding house where Mrs. O'Reilly identifies Jackson. Jane, preparing to leave town, is told the truth about Tug's reluctance to marry. She tells Dave and Chito that a miner named Hardrock knows the location of Tug's gold mine.

Tug agrees to show Gypsy the mine in exchange for Jane's release. Dave and Chito find Hardrock who escorts them to find Tug's mine. Nearing the mine, Tug refuses to go all the way until Jane is released. Dave, Chito and Hardrock arrive and a gunfight ensues. Chito and Hardrock ride away, and the Averys believe the fight is over. Dave, however, ambushes the group by jumping on John Avery. The sheriff and his posse arrive and the Avery gang is subdued. Tug and Jane marry. At the wedding reception, Dave and Chito wish the newlyweds luck and ride away.

Cast
Tim Holt as Dave Saunders
Richard Martin as Chito Rafferty
William Phipps as Tug Bailey
Veda Ann Borg as Gypsy Avery
Robert Shayne as John Avery
Elaine Riley as Jane Whipple
Douglas Fowley as Bob Rankin
 Harry Tyler as Hardrock Jones
 Dorothy Vaughan as Mrs. Brigitte O'Reilly
 Luther Crockett as Sheriff
Marshall Reed as Jackson
Stuart Randall as Slim

References

External links

1950 films
American Western (genre) films
1950 Western (genre) films
RKO Pictures films
American black-and-white films
1950s English-language films
Films directed by Lesley Selander
1950s American films